Samantha Angeline "Sam" Jones is a fictional character in the Eighth Doctor Adventures novels based upon the British science fiction television series Doctor Who. The Eighth Doctor first met her in the novel The Eight Doctors by Terrance Dicks, and she went on to become one of his companions.

Character history
Sam is born on 15 April 1980, making her 16 years old when she first meets the Eighth Doctor in 1997. She attends Coal Hill School, the same school the First Doctor's granddaughter Susan attends in 1963. She is described as thin and wiry, with blue eyes and close-cropped blonde hair. She is a clean-living person, not drinking or taking drugs, and a vegetarian. She is also a supporter of Greenpeace and gay rights. In The Eight Doctors the Doctor rescues her from drug dealers, after which she travels with him for many adventures. The novel Seeing I is deliberately ambiguous as to the possibility that Sam is bisexual.

Alien Bodies by Lawrence Miles introduces the idea of "Dark Sam". It is revealed that Sam has two sets of biodata — the information that defines a person's personal history. One set, "Blonde Sam", is the one who travels with the Doctor. The other, "Dark Sam", never traveled with the Doctor and became a drug user.

The four novels Longest Day by Michael Collier, Legacy of the Daleks by John Peel, Dreamstone Moon by Paul Leonard and Seeing I by Jonathan Blum and Kate Orman form a story arc. Initially, Sam flees from the Doctor after she finds herself kissing him passionately when giving him CPR and the two became separated. Although the Doctor eventually tracks her down, he is arrested and imprisoned for espionage. After three years, Sam discovers the Doctor's imprisonment and helps him to escape, realizing that her relationship with the Doctor will never be anything other than platonic.

In The Janus Conjunction by Trevor Baxendale, Sam dies when she becomes poisoned by radiation on the planet Janus Prime. The Doctor puts the TARDIS into a temporal orbit, devises a serum, then returns to a time before she dies and administers the serum. In The Taint by Michael Collier, Sam and the Doctor meet Fitz Kreiner. In the same story, Sam also survives having an alien leech implanted in her head by a robot called Azoth, who notes Sam's special DNA, due to the Blonde Sam/Dark Sam duality. The Dark Sam storyline reaches its conclusion in Unnatural History by Jonathan Blum and Kate Orman.

When the Doctor, Sam, and Fitz travel to San Francisco in the year 2002, they find a dimensional scar, a remnant of the events in the 1996 Doctor Who television movie. When Sam is drawn into the rift, the Doctor seeks out Dark Sam, whom he finds living in a London bedsit. He brings her to San Francisco, but Dark Sam realizes what the Doctor's plan is — if she were to fall into the rift, Blonde Sam can be restored.

When the Doctor is trapped by an extradimensional entity, Griffin the Unnaturalist, Dark Sam saves him by sacrificing herself to the rift, restoring Blonde Sam. One of Griffin's specimens, a Faction Paradox agent, reveals that Blonde Sam was created when Dark Sam touched the Doctor's biodata in the rift, causing a paradox and thus playing into the Faction's hands. During this novel, Dark Sam also has sex with Fitz, even though Blonde Sam had shown no interest in him. Dark Sam also flirts with and kisses the Doctor, but without his interest.

Sam finally departs the TARDIS after the events of the two-novel story Interference by Lawrence Miles, staying hidden in 1996 with the Doctor's former companion Sarah Jane Smith until her younger self first leaves with the Doctor. In a possible future glimpsed in Interference, Sam lives to a ripe old age, although the Doctor is evasive about her destiny in the novel The Bodysnatchers by Mark Morris.

Eventually, Sam becomes a political activist is shot and killed in 2002 in the novel Sometime Never... by Justin Richards when a group called the Council of Eight eliminates the Doctor's previous companions from the timeline. Although the Council is defeated and several companions are restored to history, the Doctor finds what appears to be Sam's grave in a London churchyard in 2005 during the last Eighth Doctor Adventures novel, The Gallifrey Chronicles by Lance Parkin.

However, the grave is bait for a trap for the Doctor, and the name on the grave is "Samantha Lynn Jones", a name used briefly by an alternative version of Dark Sam seen in Unnatural History. Accordingly, the grave's authenticity, and Sam's ultimate fate, become open to question. Jonathan Blum theorized that perhaps the Council undid the event that turned Dark Sam into Blonde Sam and then arranged for Dark Sam to die instead. However, although referencing Blum's theory in another forum post, Parkin notes in his Doctor Who chronology book A History that, despite the reversing of several of the Council's actions, it is "clear that Sam died in 2002 and 'stayed dead'."

Other appearances
In the Big Finish Productions audio play Minuet in Hell (2001), a litany of the Doctor's previous companions includes the name "Sam". At the time, fans believed that this was an intentional reference to Sam Jones and therefore placed the books and the audios in the same continuity. However, producer Gary Russell in the behind-the-scenes book Doctor Who - The New Audio Adventures later denied that "Sam" referred to Sam Jones.

The 2005 play Terror Firma introduces two previously unknown companions for the Eighth Doctor, a brother and sister pair named Samson and Gemma Griffin. This now provides the possibility that "Sam" was a reference to Samson, although the Doctor never calls Samson this to his face.

The description of an unnamed character that appears in the short story "Repercussions" by Gary Russell (in the Big Finish-published anthology Short Trips: Repercussions) resembles Sam. This character is a passenger on board an airship traveling through the time vortex that is carrying various people whom the Doctor had placed there to stop them from being a danger to the Web of Time. If that was Sam, it may indicate that, as far as the Big Finish continuity is concerned, she was written out of history.

References
 Pearson, Lars (1999). I, Who: The Unauthorized Guide to Doctor Who Novels US: Mad Norwegian Press, 
 Parkin, Lance with additional material by Lars Pearson (2006). AHistory: An Unauthorized History of the Doctor Who Universe US: Mad Norwegian Press,

External links

Footnotes

 Jonathan Blum's theory as posted on Outpost Gallifrey, correct as of the 4th of March 2006. Free registration required to view.
 Lance Parkin post on Outpost Gallifrey, correct as of the 4th of March 2006. Free registration required to view.

Literary characters introduced in 1997
Doctor Who book characters
Doctor Who spin-off companions
Female characters in literature
Fictional people from London